Rock Gym may refer to:

 Indoor climbing
Rock Gym (Elberton, Georgia), listed on the National Register of Historic Places in Georgia